HMS Setter was an  destroyer which served with the Royal Navy during the First World War. The R class were an improvement on the previous M class with geared steam turbines to improve efficiency. Laid down by J. Samuel White at East Cowes on the Isle of Wight, the destroyer was launched on 18 August 1916 and joined the Harwich Force. The ship escorted merchant vessels that travelled between the United Kingdom and the Netherlands as part of a small flotilla of destroyers.  The convoys were subject to attack from German warships, but Setter was never hit by enemy attack. Instead, during the foggy night of 17 May 1917, the destroyer was struck by sister ship , leader of the small flotilla. The damage was critical and the crew were evacuated to Sylph as Setter sank with no loss of life.

Design and development

Setter was one of seventeen  delivered to the British Admiralty as part of the Sixth War Construction Programme. The design was generally similar to the preceding M class, but differed in having geared steam turbines, the aft gun mounted on a raised platform and minor changes to improve seakeeping.

Three funnels were fitted. The ship had a complement of 82 officers and ratings.

Armament consisted of three  Mk IV QF guns on the ship's centreline, with one on the forecastle, one aft and one between the second and third funnels. A single 2-pounder (40 mm) pom-pom anti-aircraft gun was carried on a platform between two twin mounts for  torpedoes.

Construction and career
Ordered in July 1915, Setter was laid down by J. Samuel White at East Cowes on the Isle of Wight with the yard number 1478, and launched on 18 August the following year. The destroyer was completed on 12 February 1917 and was deployed as part of the Harwich Force, joining the Tenth Destroyer Flotilla. The ship escorted merchant ships that crossed between the Netherlands and the United Kingdom, termed Dutch traffic, which usually involved a flotilla leader and four destroyers steaming almost every alternate day. It was during one of these operations on 12 March that the flotilla was attacked by German torpedo boats. Setter was undamaged, but sister ship  was struck by a torpedo, although damage was minor and all the ships returned to Harwich.

On 17 May, while escorting Dutch traffic, Setter was once again part of a flotilla that encountered German torpedo boats. As the weather was foggy, it was assumed that they were members of the convoy until German voices were heard and a torpedo and three salvoes were fired by the German ships. The torpedo narrowly missed Sylph and the ships lost sight of each other. In the confusion, Setter had to turn sharply to port with engines at full power astern to avoid hitting Recruit. Unfortunately, the manoeuvre put the destroyer straight in front of Sylph, which hit the starboard quarter and caused the engine room to flood. Despite attempts to save the ship, Setter was lost. The crew boarded Sylph and, one hour and twenty minutes after being rammed, the ship sank. One merchant ship from the convoy, was sunk by the German warships. There were no casualties aboard Setter.

Pennant numbers

References

Citations

Bibliography

 
 
 
 
 
 
 

 
 
 

1916 ships
R-class destroyers (1916)
Ships built on the Isle of Wight
World War I destroyers of the United Kingdom